The Rat is a 1937 British drama film directed by Jack Raymond and starring Anton Walbrook, Ruth Chatterton, and René Ray. It is based on the play The Rat by Ivor Novello which had previously been made into a 1925 film The Rat starring Novello. It was made at Denham Studios by Herbert Wilcox Productions.

Plot
Infamous Parisian jewel thief Jean Boucheron, known as 'the Rat', attracts the fancy of socialite Zelia de Chaumont, mistress of a South American millionaire. She intends to reform 'the Rat', but he's only interested in relieving her of her pearls.

Cast
 Anton Walbrook as Jean Boucheron, 'the Rat'
 Ruth Chatterton as Zelia de Chaumont
 René Ray as Odile Verdier
 Beatrix Lehmann as Marguerite
 Mary Clare as Mere Colline
 Felix Aylmer as Prosecuting Counsel
 Hugh Miller as Luis Stets
 Gordon McLeod as Caillard
 Frederick Culley as Judge
 Nadine March as Rose
 George Merritt  Pierre Verdier
 Leo Genn as Defending Counsel
 Fanny Wright as Therese
 Bob Gregory as Albert
 Ivan Wilmot as Peter
 J.H. Roberts as Butler
 Aubrey Mallalieu as The Jeweller
 Katie Johnson as the nun in the cell

References

External links

1937 films
1937 crime drama films
British crime drama films
Films directed by Thomas Bentley
Remakes of British films
Sound film remakes of silent films
Films set in Paris
British black-and-white films
1930s English-language films
1930s British films